The Kleinwort Baronetcy, of Bolnore in Cuckfield in the County of Sussex, is a title in the Baronetage of the United Kingdom. It was created on 29 November 1909 for Alexander Kleinwort, a banker and a partner in the family firm of Kleinwort, Sons & Co.

Kleinwort baronets, of Bolnore (1909)
 Sir Alexander Drake Kleinwort, 1st Baronet (1858–1935)
 Sir Alexander Santiago Kleinwort, 2nd Baronet (1892–1983)
 Sir Kenneth Drake Kleinwort, 3rd Baronet (1935–1994)
 Sir Richard Drake Kleinwort, 4th Baronet (born 1960)

References

Further reading
 

Kleinwort